BNS Durdharsha  is a Type 021 missile boat of the Bangladesh Navy. She was commissioned in November 1988.

Design

The ship's armament consists of four C-704 anti-ship missiles and two AK-230 twin 30mm guns, mounted on the bow and stern. She is equipped with one Type 352 Square Tie radar for surface search.

Service
Durdharsha was commissioned into the Bangladesh Navy on 10 November 1988. She was severely damaged in the cyclone of April 1991. After extensive repairs she returned to active service. In 2010, the ship was upgraded with modern C-704 replacing old SY-1 missiles as mid-life upgradation.

See also
Fast attack craft
List of active ships of the Bangladesh Navy
BNS Durdanta 
BNS Dordanda 
BNS Anirban

References

Ships built in China
1988 ships
Type 021 missile boats of the Bangladesh Navy